Presidential elections were held for the first time in Iran on 25 January 1980, one year after the Iranian Revolution when the Council of the Islamic Revolution was in power. Abolhassan Banisadr was elected president with 76% of the vote.

Candidates
The number of the candidates registered to run for the presidency was 124, but only 96 of them were allowed to run. There were only 8 candidates with ballot access and the rest of candidates were write-in.

Candidates with ballot access 
Party nominees 
 Hassan Habibi (Islamic Republican Party)
 Dariush Forouhar (Nation Party)
 Kazem Sami (JAMA)
Non-partisan candidates
 Abolhassan Banisadr
 Ahmad Madani (National Front member)
 Sadeq Tabatabaei (Freedom Movement member)
 Sadegh Ghotbzadeh (Freedom Movement member)
 Mohammad Mokri (National Front member)

Withdrew 
 Hassan Ayat (Independent; Islamic Republican Party member), endorsed Jalaleddin Farsi
 Jalaleddin Farsi (Islamic Republican Party nominee), ineligible to run for the office due to his Afghan origin
 Sadegh Khalkhali (Independent), endorsed Abolhassan Banisadr
 Massoud Rajavi (People's Mujahedin of Iran nominee), forced to withdraw for opposing the Islamic Republic constitution

Declined to run 
 Ruhollah Khomeini, incumbent Supreme Leader of Iran
 Mohammad Beheshti, incumbent Chief Justice of Iran
 Mehdi Bazargan, former Prime Minister of Iran

Endorsements

Election results
Abolhassan Banisadr was elected as president.

Nationwide

Tehran

References

Presidential elections in Iran
1980 elections in Iran
Aftermath of the Iranian Revolution
Iran